John Clark Jones (5 March 1888 – 18 June 1960) was an Australian rules footballer who played with University in the Victorian Football League (VFL). He played for University in 1908 and 1909 before moving to Western Australia to play for the North Fremantle Football Club. He returned to Victoria in 1913 and played one more season with University.

Sources

Holmesby, Russell & Main, Jim (2007). The Encyclopedia of AFL Footballers. 7th ed. Melbourne: Bas Publishing.

1888 births
University Football Club players
Australian rules footballers from Melbourne
1960 deaths
People from Lilydale, Victoria
People educated at Scotch College, Melbourne